Sweet Lady is a song by American singer Tyrese Gibson. It was written by Johntá Austin, Charles Farrar and Troy Taylor for Gibson's self-titled debut studio album (1998). Production on the song was handled by The Characters. Released as the album's second single, "Sweet Lady" reached number 12 on the US Billboard Hot 100 and number 9 on the Hot R&B/Hip-Hop Songs chart, becoming Tyreses highest-charting single at the time.

Music video
The music video for "Sweet Lady" featured actress Maia Campbell.

Track listings

Credits and personnel

 Johntá Austin – writer
 Kevin Davis – mixing 
 Charles Farrar – production, writer
 Tyrese Gibson – vocals

 Thom Russo – recording
 Troy Taylor – backing vocals, production, writer
 Kevin Thomas – recording

Charts

Weekly charts

Year-end charts

References

1998 singles
Tyrese Gibson songs
Songs written by Johntá Austin
1998 songs
RCA Records singles
Songs written by Troy Taylor (record producer)
Contemporary R&B ballads
Soul ballads
1990s ballads
Music videos directed by Tim Story